Michelle Dawson (born 1961) is an autism researcher who was diagnosed with autism in 1993–1994. Since 2004, she has worked as an autism researcher affiliated with the Autism Specialized Clinic of Hôpital Rivière-des-Prairies in Montreal, Quebec, Canada.

Career
In 2004, Dawson joined Laurent Mottron's research team. Dawson says that most scientists try to determine how autistic brains are broken, but Dawson thinks it would be more useful to try to determine how autistic brains work rather than how they are broken. She has collaborated with Mottron to publish research papers, with Mottron estimating that Dawson contributes about 20% to the finished product.

She wrote a paper challenging the ethical and scientific foundations of Applied Behavior Analysis (ABA)-based autism interventions. She also challenged the medical necessity of ABA for individuals with autism in the Supreme Court of Canada in Auton v. British Columbia, 3 S.C.R. 657.

Personal
She herself was diagnosed with an autism spectrum disorder in 1993–1994. Born in 1961, Dawson was not diagnosed as a child. Dawson has been receiving disability benefits, on account of her autism diagnosis, since 2003. Michelle Dawson is a high school graduate.

Before working under Laurent Mottron, Dawson was a postal worker for the Canada Post until she took a leave of absence in 2002. Dawson filed two human rights complaints against the Canada Post, alleging that she was being discriminated against. The first complaint was settled out of court.  The second complaint was the first autism-related case taken to the Canadian Human Rights Tribunal, where she represented herself.  She won this complaint.

Dawson received an honorary doctorate from the Université de Montréal in June 2013 

In 2015, she was recognized by the Québec Human Rights and Youth Rights Commission for her human rights work.

She was awarded the Ordre de Montréal in 2017.  The award states "She has documented the poverty of scientific and ethical standards in autism intervention research, and the resulting harm to autistic people. Contrary to long-entrenched views, she believes that autistics deserve the same basic rights as the rest of humanity. She also believes that in research, as elsewhere, autistic and non-autistic people should work together as equals."

Selected works

References

External links
No Autistics Allowed, Dawson's website
The Autism Crisis: The Science and Ethics of Autism Advocacy, Dawson's blog
, where her more recent public commentary appears.

1961 births
Autism activists
Autism researchers
Canadian bloggers
Living people
People on the autism spectrum
Writers from Montreal